John Durant may refer to:

John Durant (fl. 1399–1401), MP for Rutland
John Charles Durant (1846–1929), MP for Stepney
John Durant (General Hospital)

See also
John Durant Breval, English poet, playwright and writer